Konk is the name of a recording studio and record label, established and managed by members of English rock band the Kinks.

Konk Studios

In 1971, the Kinks left Pye Records for a five-album stint with RCA, who offered them a million-dollar advance. Ray and Dave Davies put this and money from recent hits like "Lola" towards a new studio of their own in Hornsey, a mile down the road from their home territory of Muswell Hill. In the past few years the group had mainly been recording at Morgan Studios, in Willesden, London.  Albums recorded there included Lola Versus Powerman and the Moneygoround, Part One (1970), Percy (1971), Muswell Hillbillies (1971) and Everybody's in Show-Biz (1972).

The Kinks began recording full-time at the studio in about 1973. The group recorded the massive Preservation: Acts 1 & 2 (1973 & 1974) project at Konk, and it would remain their main studio until the group disbanded in 1996. It received a considerable amount of attention in 2008 when English Indie rock group the Kooks recorded an album there, entitled Konk (2008), which topped the UK albums chart in April that year.

In 1989, Big Audio Dynamite recorded Megatop Phoenix, their final album together at Konk, and they considered the Kinks an inspiration in the album's liner notes.

In 1991 the studios were used to record tracks for Rumor and Sigh, the sixth solo album by Richard Thompson.

In July 2010, Ray Davies put the studio up for sale as a redevelopment property, presumably to be demolished. In June 2011 Davies announced a delay in the sale saying "It was up for sale but I've got another record I've got to do so we're debating what to do now. It's open for discussion".  Since 2011, Konk has also hosted artist showings.

In 2012, the Fall recorded tracks for its album Re-Mit at Konk Studios.

Konk Records
Konk the label was most prolific for a few years in the late seventies. It released a handful of unsuccessful 45s and LPs before it ceased in about 1976, with the departure of business manager Tony Dimitriades. Artists in the roster included a young Claire Hamill and Café Society. Ray Davies secured the fledgling label a licensing deal with ABC Records. Davies later commented in a 1983 interview:

- Ray Davies, Time Out, 17 December 1982

The label continued to release records off and on in the next few decades. Kinks re-releases are sometimes under the "Konk" name, although the distribution is handled by Sony Music's Legacy Recordings. The Kinks fell back to their old label when Columbia Records dropped them in 1994, releasing their last record together, To the Bone. To the Bone was recorded at Konk studios in front of a small invited audience, where the group performed some of their old classics, as well as two new compositions by Ray Davies.

Rooms

The main room of Konk is the Neve Room, which was featured in the Kinks' 1983 "State of Confusion" music video. The other important room at Konk is the SSL room, opened in the early 1980s, used mainly for mixing and editing tracks.

Clients
Over time many artists have recorded at the studio. Some of these include the Stone Roses, the Kooks, Blur, Franz Ferdinand, Elvis Costello, Steve Winwood, and the Bee Gees. Bombay Bicycle Club recorded their album I Had the Blues But I Shook Them Loose at the studio.

References

Record label
British record labels
Recording studios in London
Hornsey